Redhawk Publications is a university press associated with Catawba Valley Community College in Hickory, North Carolina. The press's purpose is to "publish and distribute money-saving course textbooks as well as artistic and academic contributions" from the region, and its first was the 2016 release Polio, Pitchforks, and Perserverance: How a North Carolina County Named Catawba Built a "Miracle" (which later inspired a documentary film named Miracle). Since then, the press has released over 100 major works, including textbooks, poetry compilations, children's books, memoirs, fiction and books about local history.

See also

 List of English-language book publishing companies
 List of university presses

References

External links 
Redhawk Publications

Redhawk Publications
North Carolina